Aspidimorpha dorsata, commonly known as golden tortoise beetle or furcated tortoise beetle, is a species of leaf beetle widely distributed in Oriental region from Sri Lanka to South China towards Java, and Borneo.

Biology
After mating, the adult female lays about 150 eggs over a period of 70 to 80 days. Grub stage is about 8 to 9 days and the pupal stage is about 4 days. The species use many Ipomoea species as the host plants.

Host plants

 Argyreia hookeri
 Argyreia nervosa
 Calystegia
 Convolvulus nummularis
 Evolvulus alsinoides
 Ipomoea aquatica
 Ipomoea batatas
 Ipomoea cairica
 Ipomoea coccinea
 Ipomoea digitata
 Ipomoea excavata
 Ipomoea fistulosa
 Ipomoea hederacea
 Ipomoea hispida
 Ipomoea indica
 Ipomoea obscura
 Ipomoea palmata
 Ipomoea pestigridis
 Ipomoea pilosa
 Ipomoea tuberosa
 Ipomoea violacea
 Lettsomia elliptica
 Merremia emarginata
 Merremia tridentata
 Merremia umbellata

References 

Cassidinae
Insects of Sri Lanka
Beetles described in 1787